Yemelyanovsky District is an administrative and municipal district (raion), one of the forty-three in Krasnoyarsk Krai, Russia. It is located in the southern central part of the krai and borders with Bolshemurtinsky District in the north, Sukhobuzimsky District in the northeast, Beryozovsky District and the territory of the krai city of Krasnoyarsk in the east, Balakhtinsky District in the south, Kozulsky District in the west, and with Birilyussky District in the northwest. Its administrative center is the urban locality (an urban-type settlement) of Yemelyanovo. Population: 51,159 (2011 est.);  45,656 (2002 Census);  The population of Yemelyanovo accounts for 23.6% of the district's total population.

History
The district was founded on May 3, 1938.

Administrative and municipal divisions
Within the framework of administrative divisions, Yemelyanovsky District is one of the forty-three in the krai. The urban-type settlement of Yemelyanovo serves as its administrative center. The district is divided into thirteen selsoviets and two urban-type settlements.

As a municipal division, the district is incorporated as Yemelyanovsky Municipal District and is divided into thirteen rural settlements (corresponding to the administrative district's selsoviets) and one urban settlement. Kedrovy Urban-Type Settlement, however, is incorporated separately from the municipal district as Kedrovy Urban Okrug.

Government
As of 2013, the Head of the District and the Chairman of the District Council is Eduard G. Reyngardt. As of 2010, the District Council consists of twenty deputies.

Transportation
The Trans-Siberian Railway runs through the district territory from west to east. A part of the federal highway M53 passes through the district as well.

References

Notes

Sources

Districts of Krasnoyarsk Krai
States and territories established in 1938